Lomond can refer to any of the following:

Natural features

Ben Lomond, a mountain in Scotland, and many places named for it 
Loch Lomond, a freshwater loch in Scotland
Lake Lomond, a lake in Minnesota

Localities

Lomond, Alberta, a village in the Canadian province of Alberta
Rural Municipality of Lomond No. 37, a rural municipality in the Canadian province of Saskatchewan
Lomond, Newfoundland and Labrador, a defunct settlement in the Canadian province of Newfoundland and Labrador

Individuals

Britt Lomond (1925–2006), American actor and television producer
Lomond (horse), an Irish Thoroughbred racehorse which won the 1983 Classic 2,000 Guineas Stakes

Roads

Lomond Avenue, a street in Seacombe Heights, Adelaide, South Australia, Australia.
Lomond Avenue, a street in Downers Grove, Illinois, United States.
Lomond Crescent, a street in Winston Hills, Sydney, Australia.

See also
Lomond Hills
Lomond School
Ben Lomond (disambiguation)
Loch Lomond (disambiguation)